Port St Mary ( or Purt-noo-Moirrey) is a village district in the south-west of the Isle of Man. The village takes its name from the former Chapel of St Mary which is thought to have overlooked Chapel Bay in the village. Its population is 1,953 according to the 2011 census. In the 19th century it was sometimes called Port-le-Murray.

Geography and communications

Port St Mary is located in the south-western part of the island, near Port Erin.
A railway station is just north of the village, one of the stops on the surviving section of the Isle of Man Railway between Douglas and Port Erin. Steam trains operate on the line several times a day during the summer season, and stop at Port St Mary. The village is served by Bus Vannin services to Port Erin, Castletown, Douglas and Onchan.

Recreation

Once a fishing and trading port, the village is still popular with tourists and fishermen, especially during the summer. The inner harbour, with its pier created in 1812,  is tidal and dries out from half-tide. The outer harbour was created when the Alfred Pier got built in 1882,  is accessible at all tide states - unique amongst the Manx ports. The Royal National Lifeboat Institution has a lifeboat and station in Port St Mary since 1896. The current lifeboat, the Gough Ritchie II, lies to a permanent floating mooring inside the outer breakwater.

The village is home to the Port St Mary Golf Links, the Island's sole 9-hole golf course, and also , a primary school opened in 1993–1994. The Isle of Man Yacht Club is also based at Port St Mary harbour.

Chapel Bay, a sandy beach in the upper part of the village, is used for recreation and bathing in the summer months.

Churches and other notable buildings

Port St Mary Town Hall is an imposing stone building situated on the village's Victorian promenade at the upper end of the village and houses local government offices and a tourist information point, as well as the hall itself, which is used for performances and community gatherings and is available for private hire. The building is thought to stand on the site of the original .

The Anglican St Mary's Church lies in the centre of the village and is a chapel of ease dedicated to Mary of Nazareth lying in the parish of Rushen and diocese of Sodor and Man.

Just north of St Mary's is the Port St Mary site of the Living Hope Community Church (formerly known as Port St Mary Baptist Church). The current church building was built in the early 2000s on the site of the former Port St Mary Wesleyan Methodist Chapel, which was completed in 1895, closed in 1970 and was demolished in 2000.

In the lower part of the village, near the port, lies the current Port St Mary Methodist Chapel, built in 1903 as a Primitive Methodist chapel and known as Mount Tabor. Another smaller former Wesleyan chapel, on the High Street, opened in 1835 and was demolished in the 1970s, with the village's garden of remembrance and war memorial occupying the site.

Port St Mary is served by St Columba's Catholic Church, which lies just outside the village and is shared with Port Erin. It is a chapel of ease in the parish of St Mary's with St Columba's in the Archdiocese of Liverpool.

There are two pubs in Port St Mary - the Albert and The Railway Station, the Bay View Hotel having closed a number of years ago. The Railway Station Pub being adjacent to Port St Mary railway station on the main road to Port Erin.

A small 1860s "pepperpot" lighthouse of the end of Alfred Pier was destroyed in a storm on the night of 11/12 January 2009. It was replaced by a temporary beacon until a permanent replacement was constructed in 2018 although there is some controversy over whether it can withstand a storm.

National Dunkirk Memorial

To commemorate the 70th anniversary of her sinking, the starboard anchor of Mona's Queen, an Isle of Man Steam Packet Company vessel lost off Dunkirk during Operation Dynamo on which many seamen from the Port St Mary area served, was raised on 29 May 2010 and returned to the Isle of Man to form the centerpiece of a permanent memorial. On 29 May 2012, a memorial featuring the restored anchor and commemorating the losses in 1940 of Mona's Queen, King Orry and Fenella was opened in a ceremony at Kallow Point in Port St Mary, attended by representatives of local and national government, the Lieutenant Governor, the Isle of Man Steam Packet Company and the French Navy.

Local government

Port St Mary became a village district for local government purposes in 1890, for which Port St Mary Commissioners are responsible. The local government district is adjacent to the village district of Port Erin and the parish of Rushen.

It was claimed in Tynwald on 18 July 2018 that "it appears that Port St Mary Commissioners lurch inelegantly from one crisis to another".

Famous people 
 Colonel John Dale Lace (1859 in Port St Mary – 1937 near Johannesburg) was a South African gold and diamond mining magnate. His wife Josephine was a flamboyant Johannesburg socialite who was often seen in a carriage drawn by a team of zebras.
 Mollie Sugden (1922 in Keighley – 2009 in Guildford), actress, lived in Port St Mary for several years before returning to the United Kingdom.
 Quintin Gill (born 1959 in Blackburn), former Member of the House of Keys for Rushen between 2001 and 2011, now resides in Port St Mary.
 Juan Watterson SHK (born Isle of Man 1980) brought up in Rushen, Speaker of the House of Keys, resides in Port St Mary.
 Davy Knowles (born 1987 in Port St Mary), blues/rock guitarist and singer, currently based in Chicago, US, but returns 'home' regularly.
Vincent Peter Patrick Karalius (15 October 1932 – 13 December 2008) Famous Rugby League player "..one of the most revered figures in the history of rugby league."
John Gell (1899 – 1983) was a Manx language teacher and author who lived in Port St Mary from the 1940s until his death.

References

External links
Information about Port St Mary
Multimap
Isle of Man Yacht Club

Villages in the Isle of Man
Ports and harbours of the Isle of Man